Executive Order 13087 was signed by U.S. President Bill Clinton on May 28, 1998, amending Executive Order 11478 to prohibit discrimination based on sexual orientation in the competitive service of the federal civilian workforce.  The order also applies to employees of the government of the District of Columbia, and the United States Postal Service.  However, it does not apply to positions and agencies in the excepted service, such as the Central Intelligence Agency, National Security Agency, and the Federal Bureau of Investigation.

In a statement issued the same day that he signed the order, President Clinton said: 

Federal employees cannot appeal claims of discrimination under Executive Order 13087 to the EEOC, but they can file complaints under the grievance procedure of the agency where they work and, under certain conditions, may appeal their claims to the Merit Systems Protection Board or the Office of Special Counsel.

Clinton had previously included "sexual orientation" in Executive Order 12968 (1995) when listing the characteristics forbidden as the basis for discrimination when granting federal employees access to classified information.

The order applied to civilian employees of the American military, but not to uniformed members of the armed forces, who, at the time, were covered by the Don't ask, don't tell directive issued by Clinton in 1993.

Opponents in Congress objected to the Order and said that it provided special privileges and "special breaks for special interests," Donald Devine, who headed the Office of Personnel Management from 1981 to 1995, criticized Clinton's decision to implement the non-discrimination policy by issuing an Executive Order, "issued out of the glare of public attention," and called on Congress to act to undo the President's action "before it can do much damage both to the orderly management of the government and to its equal employment policies generally." On June 11, 1998, the conservative Southern Baptist Convention passed a resolution asking the President to rescind the order and demanding that Congress nullify it if he did not do so. Later in 1998, several congressmen, including Republicans Bob Barr of Georgia and Joel Hefley of Colorado, introduced bills designed to overturn 13087 or to prohibit government agencies from spending any funds to enforce it. In August 1998, an amendment to the Commerce, Justice, State, Judiciary, and Related Agencies appropriations bill that sought to prohibit spending on behalf of 13087 failed in the House of Representatives on a vote of 176 to 252, the only recorded vote on the issue.

According to the Equal Employment Opportunity Commission:

In 2005, the Human Rights Campaign and others claimed that "the head of the Office of Special Counsel, Scott Bloch, refuses to enforce these longstanding non-discrimination protections."

See also
Executive order (United States)

References

External links
Text of Executive Order 13087 in the Federal Register (PDF document)
Office of Personnel Management, "Addressing Sexual Orientation Discrimination In Federal Civilian Employment:  A Guide to Employee's Rights" 
Federal GLOBE, "Order Offers Equal, Not Special, Protection for Gays"
Federal GLOBE, "President's Order Protects Workers"
The Advocate, "Complaint filed against allegedly antigay Bush appointee"
Executive Order 12968 of August 2, 1995, accessed July 14, 2011 - regarding security clearances, prohibits discrimination "... on the basis of race, color, religion, sex, national origin, disability, or sexual orientation in granting access to classified information".

13087
Discrimination in the United States
History of LGBT civil rights in the United States
LGBT law in the United States
1998 in LGBT history
1998 in American politics
United States Office of Personnel Management